Delp may refer to:

People
Alfred Delp, German Jesuit priest
Brad Delp, American musician

Places
 Delp, a minor planet
 Delp, Indiana, an unincorporated community

Other
 Domestic Efficient Lighting Programme (DELP), a Government Scheme in India